NGC 26 is a spiral galaxy in the Pegasus constellation. It was discovered on 14 September 1865 by Heinrich Louis d'Arrest.

References

External links
 
 

Galaxies discovered in 1865
0026
18650914
Pegasus (constellation)
Unbarred spiral galaxies